The 1908 municipal election was held December 14, 1908 for the purpose of electing a mayor and six aldermen to sit on the Edmonton City Council, as well as three public school trustees and five separate school trustees.  There were also five proposed bylaws put to a vote of the electorate concurrently with the election.

Positions to be elected

There were eight aldermen on city council, but two of the positions were already filled: George S. Armstrong and Robert Manson had been elected to two-year terms in 1907 and were still in office. Robert Lee and Thomas Bellamy had also been elected to two-year terms in 1907, but had resigned to run for mayor.  Accordingly, the fifth and sixth-place finishers in the aldermanic race - Andrew Agar and Daniel Fraser - were elected to one-year terms.

There were five trustees on the public board of trustees, but two of the positions were already occupied: A E May and Alex Taylor had been elected to two-year terms in 1907 and were still in office.

Campaign

The campaign's major issue was how to best increase the city's water supply.  Mayoral candidate Robert Lee supported enhancing the capacity of the existing plant, while his opponent, Thomas Bellamy, favoured constructing a new plant.  According to the Edmonton Bulletin, Lee's earlier entry into the race and early success at recruiting prominent citizens as his public supporters was a decisive factor in his defeat of Bellamy, who entered the race later.

Voter turnout

There were 1942 ballots cast in the 1908 municipal election. The number of eligible voters is no longer available.

Results

(bold indicates elected, italics indicate incumbent)

Mayor

Robert Lee - 1303
Thomas Bellamy - 639

Aldermen

Wilfrid Gariépy - 1,424
John Lundy - 1020
Herman McInnes - 1,010
James McKinley - 902
Andrew Agar - 891
Daniel Fraser - 812
Cameron Anderson - 742
A E Potter - 560
Alex McSporan - 462
James Francis - 353
Frank Ball - 296
John Galbraith - 274
Thomas Killips - 115

Public School Trustees

Walter Ramsey - 818
Allan Gray - 780
William Clark - 761
William Ferris - 533
J G M Sloan - 489
Gregory Krikewsky - 273
William Eastwood - 229

Separate (Catholic) School Trustees
 
James Collisson, Wilfrid Gariépy, Prosper-Edmond Lessard, J McAllister, and Joseph Henri Picard were elected.  Detailed results are no longer available.

Bylaws

The following bylaws were voted on concurrently with the 1908 election:

Bylaw 161
A bylaw to raise $42,500 to pay for part of a traffic deck on the C.P.R. Bridge.
For: 1,072
Against: 47

Bylaw 164
A bylaw to raise $30,000 to supplement $49,000 to pay for street railway material.
For: 921
Against: 110

Bylaw 165
A bylaw to raise $40,000 for improvement in and extensions to the Municipal Telephone System.
For: 1,022
Against: 34

Bylaw 166
A bylaw to raise the sum of $60,000 for improvement in and extensions to Municipal Electric Plant.
For: 1,019
Against: 33

Bylaw 167
A bylaw to raise $5,000 to supplement previous amounts for an Isolation Hospital.
For: 841
Against: 89

References

City of Edmonton: Edmonton Elections
"Alderman Lee Mayor for 1909", Edmonton Bulletin, December 15, 1908.

1908
1908 elections in Canada
1908 in Alberta